Nikhil Chandra Shekhar Poojary (born 3 September 1995), is an Indian professional footballer who plays as a winger for the Indian Super League club Hyderabad.

Club career
Born in Mangalore, Karnataka to a Tulu speaking Billava family, Poojary started his career with Ryan FC in Mumbai. While with Ryan FC, Poojary was selected to play for the Maharashtra under-19 side in the school games nationals. Poojary soon joined the youth side of Mumbai before signing with Kolkata giants East Bengal in 2015.

Poojary made his first-team debut for East Bengal on 4 August 2016 in their opening Calcutta Football League fixture against Bhawanipore. He came on as a 78th minute substitute for Jiten Murmu as East Bengal won 2–1. Poojary scored his first goal for the club on 23 September 2016 during the group stage match of the Bordoloi Trophy against Bongobi Agragami of Bangladesh. His strike in the 87th minute was the last goal in a 6–0 victory.

International career
He scored his first international goal against Maldives in the 2018 SAFF Championship.

Career statistics

Club

International

International goals
Scores and results list India's goal tally first

Honours

India
 SAFF Championship runner-up: 2018
 Intercontinental Cup: 2017

References

External links 
 Source for confirmed signing by FC Pune City 

 East Bengal Profile

1995 births
Living people
Sportspeople from Mangalore
Indian footballers
Mumbai FC players
East Bengal Club players
Association football midfielders
Footballers from Karnataka
Calcutta Football League players
I-League players
Indian Super League players
FC Pune City players
Hyderabad FC players
India international footballers
India youth international footballers